Blagdon railway station is a closed terminus railway station situated in the village of Blagdon in North Somerset, England.

The station closed to passengers on 14 September 1931.

Despite the station being closed for passengers it was host to a GWR camp coach from 1935 to 1939.

The station closed to goods on 1 November 1950. The site is now a private house.

References

Bibliography
 
 
 
 

Disused railway stations in Somerset
Railway stations in Great Britain opened in 1901
Railway stations in Great Britain closed in 1931
Former Great Western Railway stations